This list is of the Cultural Properties of Japan designated in the categories of  and  for the Circuit of Hokkaidō.

National Cultural Properties

Calligraphic works and classical texts
As of 1 November 2016, one Important Cultural Property has been designated in the category of calligraphic works, being of national significance.

Ancient documents
As of 1 November 2016, zero Important Cultural Properties have been designated.

Prefectural Cultural Properties

Writings

See also
 Cultural Properties of Japan
 List of National Treasures of Japan (writings: Chinese books)
 List of National Treasures of Japan (writings: Japanese books)
 List of National Treasures of Japan (writings: others)
 List of National Treasures of Japan (ancient documents)
 List of Cultural Properties of Japan - historical materials (Hokkaidō)

References

External links
  Cultural Properties in Hokkaidō

Cultural Properties - Writings
Writings,Hokkaidō